Mackye Dre Townsend West (born 1 August 2003) is an English professional  footballer who plays as a defender for Southern League Premier Division Central club Royston Town, on loan from  club Stevenage.

Career

Stevenage
Townsend-West joined the Stevenage youth academy after academy scouts saw him playing in a trial game in 2019. Academy manager Robbie O'Keefe stated that Townsend-West had impressed with his "raw pace" and technical ability in the trial match. 

Whilst still a first-year scholar in the club's academy, Townsend-West was an unused substitute for the first-team's 2–0 away defeat away at Peterborough United in the FA Cup on 19 November 2019. He made his professional debut in the club's 3–2 EFL Trophy defeat against Milton Keynes Dons at Broadhall Way on 6 October 2020. Townsend-West signed his first professional contract with Stevenage on 15 October 2020. He made one appearance during the 2021–22 season, missing eight months of the season due to injury, and was retained by the club in May 2022.

Ahead of the 2022–23 season, Stevenage manager Steve Evans stated Townsend-West would leave the club on loan, once he had recovered from a "small knock" sustained in pre-season, in order to gain first-team experience. He joined National League South club St Albans City on 5 August 2022, on a loan agreement until January 2023. After making four appearances for St Albans, Townsend-West was recalled by Stevenage in December 2022 and immediately loaned to Southern League Premier Division Central club Royston Town.

Career statistics

References

External links

2003 births
Living people
English footballers
Association football defenders
Association football midfielders
Stevenage F.C. players
St Albans City F.C. players
Royston Town F.C. players
English Football League players